Kristiaan Reuder or Christian Reder (1656 – 1729) was a German painter who travelled to Rome.

He was born in Leipzig and travelled to Venice at a young age. By 1690 he was in Rome, where he married Eleonora Paperi in 1693 and was reported to have eight children in 1709.

Reuder became a member of the Bentvueghels with the nickname Leander. He died in Rome.

References

 Christian Reder on artnet

1656 births
1729 deaths
Artists from Leipzig
German painters
German male painters
Members of the Bentvueghels